The 2020 Puerto Rican municipal election was held on November 3, 2020, to elect the mayors of the 78 municipalities of Puerto Rico, concurrently with the election of the Governor, the Resident Commissioner, the Senate, and the House of Representatives. The winners were be elected to a four-year term from January 3, 2021, to January 3, 2025.

While the Popular Democratic Party kept most of the municipalities, its majority went down from 45 to 41. A total of 26 municipalities flipped parties, including many party strongholds, like Aguadilla (32 years under PNP) and Humacao (20 years under PPD).

Results

Adjuntas 

Incumbent mayor Jaime Barlucea Maldonado won the PNP primary. Barlucea lost the election to José Soto Rivera, ending the 12 years of PNP control of the municipality.

Aguada 

Incumbent PNP mayor Manuel Santiago Mendoza lost his party's primaries to Luis Echevarría Santiago. He went on to lose to PPD candidate Christian Cortés Feliciano.

Aguadilla 

Previous PNP mayor Carlos Méndez Martínez renounced to his post on January 21, 2020, after 23 years in the job, stating "...it's time to rest and travel." Yanitsia Irizarry Méndez became interim mayor and won the PNP primary. She lost to PPD candidate Julio Roldán Concepción, ending 32 years of PNP control of the municipality.

Aguas Buenas 

Incumbent mayor Javier García Pérez won his second term.

Aibonito 

Tomás Alvarado won the PPD primary. Nonetheless, incumbent mayor William Alicea Pérez won his fourth term.

Añasco 

Incumbent mayor Jorge Estévez Martínez ran for a 4th term, but lost to PNP primary winner Kabir Solares García, ending 12 years of PPD control of the municipality.

Arecibo 

Incumbent mayor Carlos Molina Rodríguez ran for a 3rd term, won the PNP primary, but lost to PPD primary winner Carlos Ramírez Irizarry, ending 16 years of PNP control of the municipality.

Arroyo 

Incumbent mayor Eric Bachier Román won his third term.

Barceloneta 

Incumbent mayor Wanda Soler Rosario won the PPD primary and her third term.

Barranquitas 

Previous PNP mayor Francisco López López renounced to his post on September 18, 2019, after 22 years in the job. Later, on November 14, 2019, Elliot Colón Blanco was elected mayor in a special election to finish López's term. Colón Blanco was re-elected to serve his first full term in office.

Bayamón 

Incumbent mayor Ramón Rivera Cruz won his sixth term.

Cabo Rojo 

Incumbent mayor Roberto Ramírez Kurtz ran for a 3rd term, but lost to PNP primary winner Jorge Morales Wiscovitch.

Caguas 

Roberto López won the PNP primary. Nonetheless, incumbent mayor William Miranda Torres won his third term.

Camuy 

Previous PNP mayor Edwin García Feliciano renounced to his post on February 28, 2020, after 16 years in the job, to become the Ombudsman. Gabriel Hernández Rodríguez became mayor for the rest of his García Feliciano's term and won the election.

Canóvanas 

Awilda Iglesias Muñoz won the PPD primary. Nonetheless, incumbent mayor Lorna Soto Villanueva won the PNP primary and her second term.

Carolina 

Incumbent mayor José Aponte Dalmau won his fourth term.

Cataño 

Incumbent mayor Félix Delgado Montalvo won his second term.

Cayey 

Incumbent mayor Rolando Ortiz Velázquez won his seventh term.

Ceiba 

Incumbent mayor Angelo Cruz Ramos lost the PNP primary to Samuel Rivera Báez. Rivera Báez went on to win the election.

Ciales 

Previous PNP mayor Luis Maldonado Rodríguez announced on September 21, 2018, that he would not seek re-election for a 4th term. Alexander Burgos Otero won the PNP primary, while José Carrer González won the PPD primary. Alexander Burgos Otero ultimately won the mayoral race.

Cidra 

Incumbent mayor Javier Carrasquillo Cruz ran for a 3rd therm, but lost to PPD candidate David Concepción González.

Coamo 

Incumbent mayor Juan García Padilla won his sixth term.

Comerío 

Incumbent mayor José Santiago Rivera won his sixth term.

Corozal 

Incumbent mayor Sergio Torres Torres ran for a 3rd term, won the PPD primary, but lost to PNP candidate Luis García Rolón.

Culebra 

Incumbent mayor Iván Solís Bermúdez ran for a 3rd term, but lost to Edilberto Romero Llovet.

Dorado 

Incumbent mayor Carlos López Rivera won his ninth term.

Fajardo 

Previous PNP mayor Aníbal Meléndez Rivera renounced to his post on February 19, 2020, after 31 years in the job. His son, José Meléndez Méndez became mayor for the rest of his father's term, won the PNP primary and the election.

Florida 

Incumbent mayor José Gerena Polanco won his third term.

Guánica 

Both PPD candidate Ismael Rodríguez Ramos and Write-In candidate Edgardo Cruz Vélez claimed victory, with the official count stating that Cruz Vélez was the winner. The case was taken to court, where it was determined that 38 votes had been duplicated, and had to be eliminated, giving Rodíguez Ramos the win. After multiple court revisions, Rodíguez Ramos was declared the official winner, and ratified as mayor of Guánica.

Guayama 

Incumbent mayor Eduardo Cintrón Suárez won his third term.

Guayanilla 

Incumbent mayor Nelson Torres Yordán ran for a second term, but lost to PNP candidate Raúl Rivera Rodríguez, ending 20 years of PPD control of the municipality.

Guaynabo 

Previous PNP mayor Hector O'Neill Garcia was suspended on May 24, 2017, on complaints filled against him for sexual harassment, and then resigned on June 5, 2017. Later, on August 7, 2017, Ángel Pérez Otero was elected mayor in a special election to finish O'Neill Garcia's term. Pérez Otero was re-elected to serve her first full term in office.

Gurabo 

Previous PNP mayor Víctor Ortiz Díaz was arrested on December 7, 2016, on charges related to extortion and soliciting a bribe. Later, on April 2, 2017, Rosachely Rivera Santana was elected mayor in a special election to finish Ortiz Díaz's term. Rivera Santana was re-elected to serve her first full term in office.

Hatillo 

Incumbent mayor José Rodríguez Cruz won his fifth term.

Hormigueros 

Incumbent mayor Pedro García Figueroa won his fifth term.

Humacao 

Previous PPD mayor Marcelo Trujillo Panisse passed away while in office on September 15, 2019. Later, on November 10, 2019, Luis Sánchez Hernández was elected mayor in a special election to finish Trujillo Panisse's term. Reinaldo Vargas Rodríguez won the PNP primary. Vargas won the election, ending 20 years of PPD control of the municipality.

Isabela 

Incumbent PPD mayor Carlos Delgado Altieri announced he would not seek re-election, instead opting to run for governor. Miguel Méndez Pérez won the PPD primary, beating 3 other candidates, including the incumbent mayor's son, Carlos Delgado Irizarry.  Melvin Concepción Corchado won the PNP primary. Méndez ultimately won the election.

Jayuya 

Elvin Rodríguez Pagán won the PNP primary. Nonetheless, incumbent mayor Jorge González Otero won his seventh term.

Juana Díaz 

Incumbent mayor Ramón Hernández Torres won his sixth term.

Juncos 

Incumbent mayor Alfredo Alejandro Carrión won his sixth term.

Lajas 

Incumbent mayor Marcos Irizarry Pagán ran for a 3rd term, won the PPD primary, but lost to PNP candidate Jayson Martínez Maldonado.

Lares 

Previous mayor Roberto Pagán Centeno renounced to his post on January 3, 2020, after 16 years in the job. The municipal committee quickly confirmed Pagán Centeno's son, Carlos Pagán Crespo as a candidate for mayor, without waiting for the PNP directory's orders. The directory's evaluating committee ultimately rejected Pagán Crespo's candidacy for endorsing independent candidate Abel Nazario Quiñones for the senate. After that, José Rodríguez Ruiz became mayor and ran for a full term in office, but lost to PPD candidate Fabián Arroyo Rodríguez.

Las Marías 

Incumbent mayor Edwin Soto Santiago won his second term.

Las Piedras 

Incumbent mayor Miguel López Rivera won his fourth term.

Loíza 

Lymarie Escobar Quiñones won the PNP primary. Nonetheless, incumbent mayor Julia Nazario Fuentes won her second term.

Luquillo 

Incumbent mayor Jesús Márquez Rodríguez won his fourth term.

Manatí 

Incumbent mayor José Sánchez González won his second term.

Maricao 

Incumbent mayor Gilberto Pérez Valentín ran for a 7th term, won the PNP primary, but lost to Wilfredo Ruiz Feliciano, ending 28 years of PNP control of the municipality.

Maunabo 

Incumbent mayor Jorge Márquez Pérez ran for 6th term, but lost to PNP candidate Ángel Lafuente Amaro, ending 20 years of PPD control in the municipality.

Mayagüez 

Tania Lugo López won the PNP primary. Nonetheless, incumbent mayor José Rodríguez Rodríguez won his eighth term.

Moca 

Previous PNP mayor José Avilés Santiago confirmed on October 24, 2018, that he would not run for re-election, leaving after 20 years as mayor. Ángel Pérez Rodríguez ended up winning PNP primary and the mayoral seat.

Morovis 

Incumbent mayor Carmen Maldonado González won her second term.

Naguabo 

Incumbent mayor Noé Marcano Riveri ran for a 3th term, won the PNP primary, but lost to Miraidaliz Rosario Pagán, ending 12 years of PNP control of the municipality.

Naranjito 

Joel Chevres Santiago won the PPD primary. Nonetheless, incumbent mayor Orlando Ortiz Chevres won his fourth term.

Orocovis 

Incumbent mayor Jesús Colón Berlingeri won his seventh term in office.

Patillas 

Incumbent mayor Norberto Soto Figueroa ran for a 3rd term, but lost to PNP candidate Maritza Sánchez Neris.

Peñuelas 

Previous PPD mayor Walter Torres Maldonado renounced to his post on December 31, 2018, after 21 years in the job. The party, knowing beforehand that Torres Maldonado was going to renounce, did an internal primary in the municipality, with Gregory Gonsález Souchet being chosen as the new mayor. While Josean González Febres won PNP primary, the incumbent mayor Gregory Gonsález Souchet won his first full term.

Ponce 

Incumbent mayor María Meléndez Altieri ran for a 4th term, won the PNP primary, but lost to PPD primary winner Luis Irizarry Pabón, ending 12 years of PNP control of the municipality.

Quebradillas 

Incumbent mayor Heriberto Vélez Vélez won his fifth term.

Rincón 

Incumbent mayor Carlos López Bonilla won the PPD primary and his sixth term.

Río Grande 

Mayra Pérez Bulerín won the PNP primary. Nonetheless, incumbent mayor Ángel González Damudt won the PPD primary and his second term.

Sabana Grande 

Previous PPD mayor Miguel Ortiz Vélez was arrested on July 5, 2018, for running a corruption scheme, With Noel Matías Borrero working as interim mayor and later mayor till the end of the term. Luis Flores Santiago won the PNP primary, while Marcos Valentín Flores won the PPD primary. Marcos Valentín Flores ultimately won the mayoral race.

Salinas 

Raúl Zayas Rodríguez won the PNP primary. Nonetheless, Karilyn Bonilla Colón won her third term.

San Germán 

Incumbent mayor Isidro Negrón Irizarry ran for a 6th term, won the PPD primary, but lost to Virgilio Olivera Olivera, ending 20 years of PPD control of the municipality.

San Juan 

Incumbent PPD mayor Carmen Yulín Cruz announced she would not seek re-election, instead opting to run for governor. Miguel Romero Lugo won the PNP primary, and later the mayoral race. The major surprise was that the PPD candidate Rossana López León came 3rd, while MVC candidate Manuel Natal Albelo came in a very close second. It was the only municipality to have a mayoral candidate of every party running in the election.

San Lorenzo 

Jaime Alverio Ramos won against incumbent mayor José Román Abreu, ending 20 years of PPD control of the municipality.

San Sebastián 

Incumbent mayor Javier Jiménez Pérez won his fifth term.

Santa Isabel 

Incumbent mayor Enrique Questell Alvarado ran for a 5th term, won the PNP primary, but lost to Rafael Burgos Santiago.

Toa Alta 

Héctor Collazo Ayala won the PNP primary. Nonetheless, incumbent mayor Clemente Agosto Lugardo won the PPD primary and his third term.

Toa Baja 

Incumbent mayor Bernardo Márquez García won the PNP primary and his second term.

Trujillo Alto 

Incumbent mayor José Cruz Cruz won the PPD primary and his fourth term.

Utuado 

Jorge Pérez Heredia won the PNP primary. Pérez won against incumbent mayor Ernesto Irizarry Salvá.

Vega Alta 

Incumbent mayor Oscar Santiago Martínez ran for a 2nd term, but lost to María Vega Pagán.

Vega Baja 

Melvin Carrión Rivera won the PNP primary. Nonetheless, incumbent mayor Marcos Cruz Molina won his third term.

Vieques 

Incumbent mayor Víctor Emeric Catarineau ran for a 3rd term, but lost to José Corcino Acevedo.

Villalba 

Incumbent mayor Luis Hernández Ortiz won his second term.

Yabucoa 

Incumbent mayor Rafael Surillo Ruiz won his third term.

Yauco 

Incumbent mayor Ángel Torres Ortiz won his second term.

Notes

References 

General elections in Puerto Rico
2020 in Puerto Rico
Puerto Rico
November 2020 events in the United States
2020 Puerto Rico elections
2020 United States mayoral elections